Dehrud-e Sofla (also Romanized as Dehrūd-e Soflá and Dehrood Sofla; also known as Dehrūd-e Pā’īn) is a village in Dehrud Rural District of Eram District, Dashtestan County, Bushehr province, Iran. At the 2006 census, its population was 1,666 in 343 households. The following census in 2011 counted 2,000 people in 574 households. The latest census in 2016 showed a population of 2,218 people in 602 households; it was the largest village in its rural district.

References 

Populated places in Dashtestan County